Monroe County is a county in the U.S. state of Indiana. In 1910 the US Census Bureau calculated the nation's mean population center to lie in Monroe County. The population was 137,974 at the 2010 United States Census. The county seat is Bloomington. Monroe County is part of the Bloomington, Indiana, Metropolitan Statistical Area.

History
Monroe County was formed in 1818 from portions of Orange County. It was named for James Monroe, fifth President of the United States, who was in that office from 1817 until 1825.

Demographics

As of the 2020 United States Census, there were 139,718 people and 56,399 households with an average of 2.34 persons per household in the county. As of July 1, 2021 there were 64,362 housing units of which 55.2% were owner-occupied. The racial makeup of the county was 86.0% white, 6.9% Asian, 3.9% black or African American, 0.3% American Indian, 0.1% Native Hawaiian and Other Pacific Islander, and 2.8% from two or more races. Those of Hispanic or Latino origin made up 3.8% of the population. 

According to the American Community Survey, as of 2021, there were 56,714 households with the average household size of 2.18 persons. Out of those 27,340 households were families with the average family size of 2.87 persons, 22.1% had children under the age of 18 living with them. A total of 37.3% of all households were householders living alone. 

The median income for a household in the county was $51,945 (in 2021 USD) and the per capita income was $30,609. Males had a median income of $52,263 versus $47,953 for females.

About 10.6% of families and 22.8% of the population were below the poverty line, including 14.7% of those under age 18 and 6.2% of those age 65 or over.

Geography
The county terrain is low rolling hills, covered with vegetation and largely devoted to agricultural use or urban development. The eastern part is carved with drainages and gullies, leading to Griffy Lake. The county's highest point is McGuire Benchmark, just NW of Bloomington, at 994' (303m) ASL.

Adjacent counties

 Morgan (north)
 Brown (northeast)
 Jackson (southeast)
 Lawrence (south)
 Greene (southwest)
 Owen (northwest)

Bodies of water

Monroe County is divided between the basins of the East Fork and West Fork of Indiana's White River. The northern part drains to the West Fork; the southern part of the county drains to the East Fork, primarily via the Salt Creek and its tributaries, such as the Clear Creek (known as the "Jordan River" on Indiana University Bloomington campus).

Several artificial reservoirs have been constructed by damming the county's creeks. The largest is Monroe Lake, a large reservoir on Salt Creek in the southeastern part of the county. It is used both for recreational purposes and to supply the city with drinking water. Until the late 1960s, the main source of water supply was the smaller Lake Lemon (constructed 1953), in the northeastern part of the county; it is now the backup water source and is mainly used for recreation.

The third largest is Griffy Lake, on the northern slope of the county. Constructed in 1924 by damming Griffy Creek, it was Bloomington's main water source until 1954; it is now used primarily for recreation although it also serves as an emergency water source. In 2012–2013, the lake was drained, the dam repaired, and the lake was refilled.

A smaller lake, Weimer (Wapehani) in the Clear Creek basin, was constructed for water supply purposes, but during most of its history was used purely for recreation - mainly fishing. In 2017 authorities revealed plans to drain this lake permanently, as it was considered to be unsafe. This was carried out in the summer of 2018.

Limestone has been quarried in Monroe County since 1826.
A number of abandoned limestone quarries in the county are now cliff-surrounded lakes (as seen in the 1979 film Breaking Away), stable without ongoing human intervention.

National protected areas

 Hoosier National Forest (part)

Natural wonders
 Buckner Cave
 Leonard Springs Nature Park, where the water of Sinking Creek reappears in springs

Communities

Cities
 Bloomington

Towns
 Ellettsville
 Stinesville

Census-designated places
 Harrodsburg
 Smithville-Sanders

Unincorporated communities

 Arlington
 Broadview
 Buenavista
 Cascade
 Chapel Hill
 Clear Creek
 Dolan
 Eastern Heights
 Elwren
 Fairfax
 Fleener
 Forest Park Heights
 Garden Acres
 Handy
 Highland Village
 Hindustan
 Hoosier Acres
 Kirby
 Kirksville
 Knight Ridge
 Lancaster Park
 Leonard Springs
 Marlin Hills
 Modesto
 Mount Tabor
 New Unionville
 Ridgemede
 Sanders
 Smithville
 Stanford
 Sunny Slopes
 Unionville
 Van Buren Park
 Victor
 Wayport
 West Brook Downs
 Woodbridge
 Woodville Hills
 Yellowstone

Former communities
 Paynetown at  - flooded by Lake Monroe

Townships

 Bean Blossom
 Benton
 Bloomington
 Clear Creek
 Indian Creek
 Perry
 Polk
 Richland
 Salt Creek
 Van Buren
 Washington

Climate and weather

Government and politics

The county government is a constitutional body, and is granted specific powers by the Constitution of Indiana, and by the Indiana Code.

County Council: The fiscal body of the county government; controls spending and revenue collection in the county. There are four elected members representing districts and three members elected at-large. The council members serve staggered four-year terms. They are responsible for setting salaries, the annual budget, and special spending. The council also has authority to impose local taxes, in the form of an income and property tax that is subject to state level approval, excise taxes, and service taxes.

Board of Commissioners: A three-member board serving as the executive and legislative body of the county. The commissioners are elected county-wide, in staggered four-year terms. The president of this board is the county's principal executive officer. The commissioners are charged with setting policy and managing the day-to-day functions of the county government.

Court: The county maintains a unified circuit court with nine divisions and a court commissioner who handles civil cases. Judges must be members of the Indiana Bar Association; they are elected to six-year terms. Some court decisions can be appealed to the state level (appeals court, state supreme court).

County Officials: The county has several other elected offices, including sheriff, coroner, auditor, treasurer, recorder, surveyor, assessor, and circuit court clerk. They are elected county-wide to four-year terms. Members elected to county government positions are required to declare party affiliations and to be residents of the county.

Monroe County is part of Indiana's 9th congressional district and is represented in Congress Republican Trey Hollingsworth. It is part of Indiana Senate districts 37, 40 and 44; and Indiana House of Representatives districts 46, 60 and 61.

Courthouse
The Monroe County Courthouse is the seat of government for Monroe County and is the traditional center of Bloomington. The third courthouse to stand on the Downtown Square, the current courthouse was built in 1907 during a time of great prosperity. Wing & Mahurin designed the building.

Politics
Monroe County traditionally leaned Republican. However, like many counties with large universities, it has trended strongly towards Democrats in recent years, voting for the Democratic nominee in 7 out of the last 8 presidential elections. In 2008, Barack Obama turned in the strongest showing for a Democrat since 1888. It has gone Democratic by large margins since then, and is now considered one of the few reliably Democratic counties in traditionally Republican Indiana. In recent years, only Marion County (Indianapolis) has been more Democratic.

Education
Monroe County Public Library operates branches at Bloomington and Ellettsville.

Monroe County is home to Indiana University Bloomington.

Transportation

Major highways 
 
  Indiana State Road 37
  Indiana State Road 45
  Indiana State Road 46
  Indiana State Road 48
  Indiana State Road 446

For many years Monroe County was one of the most populous counties in the USA which did not contain any US highways or Interstate highways. However, in December 2015 the I-69 extension was completed into the county and this distinction disappeared. The highway was further extended north into Morgan County in 2018.

Railways

Although Monroe County has a rich railway history, currently its only railway is the Indiana Rail Road, whose mainline crosses the county from the north-east to the south-west, with branches to a few industrial facilities. There is no passenger service.

Between 1854 and 2004, an important north–south line connecting the Ohio River with Lake Michigan crossed Monroe County as well, serving Stinesville, Elletsville, Bloomington, Smithville, and Harrodsburg. It was operated by the Monon Railroad throughout much of the 20th century, and later by CSX. The last passenger service operating on this line was Amtrak's  Floridian Chicago-Miami service, during 1972–1979. With the termination of this service in 1979, Monroe County lost passenger railway service. CSX continued to use this line for freight for another quarter of a century, but in 2004, it stopped using this line. Large parts of it have since been converted to trails.

Air transport
 Monroe County Airport, southwest of Bloomington. Scheduled passenger service to this airport was terminated ca. 1997, and since then the airport has been used by general aviation only.

See also
 National Register of Historic Places listings in Monroe County, Indiana

References

External links
Monroe County Government

 
Indiana counties
1818 establishments in Indiana
Populated places established in 1818
Bloomington metropolitan area, Indiana